Da Niang Dumplings Holdings Limited or Jiangsu DaNiang Dumpling Co., Ltd, doing business as Da Niang Dumpling (DND), is a Chinese fast food restaurant chain headquartered in Tianning District, Changzhou, Jiangsu. It is the largest dumpling store chain in Mainland China. The logo states "Wu Da Niang" ).

History
The company was founded in April 1996.

In 2012 there were 424 restaurants. By 2013 the number grew to 514. At the end of 2013 the company had a total of over 440 locations in 90 Mainland Chinese cities. In 2013 the company had over 1.5 billion renminbi (US$244 million) in sales.

CVC Capital Partners bought the company from its founder in December 2013. In 2014 the company was ranked No. 9 in ''China Daily's " Top 10 fast-food chains in China".

References

External links

 Da Niang Dumpling
 Da Niang Dumpling 

Companies based in Changzhou
Restaurants established in 1996
1996 establishments in China
Fast-food chains of China